Endicott Howard Peabody (February 15, 1920 – December 2, 1997) was an American politician from Massachusetts. A Democrat, he served a single two-year term as the 62nd Governor of Massachusetts, from 1963 to 1965. His tenure is probably best known for his categorical opposition to the death penalty and for signing into law the bill establishing the University of Massachusetts Boston. After losing the 1964 Democratic gubernatorial primary, Peabody made several more failed bids for office in Massachusetts and New Hampshire, including failed campaigns for the U.S. Senate in 1966 and 1986.

Born in Lawrence, Massachusetts to a family with deep colonial roots, Peabody played college football at Harvard University, where he earned honors as an All-American lineman.  He served in the United States Navy in World War II before embarking on a political career noted more for its failures than its successes.  He made multiple unsuccessful attempts to win the position of Massachusetts Attorney General, and for the United States Senate representing both Massachusetts and New Hampshire, and ran for United States Vice President in 1972.

Early life
Endicott Peabody, nicknamed "Chub", was born in Lawrence, Massachusetts, the son of Mary Elizabeth (née Parkman) and the Reverend Malcolm E. Peabody, a former Episcopal Bishop of Central New York. He was a grandson of the founder of Groton School and Brooks School, also named Endicott Peabody, and was a descendant of colonial governor John Endecott.  He first attended the William Penn Charter School, and graduated in 1938 from the Groton School.  He earned his A.B. from Harvard College in 1942, majoring in history.  Peabody played on the Harvard Crimson football team and also played ice hockey and tennis. He stood out in football, where he was known as the "baby-faced assassin", playing three seasons on the varsity squad, and was the only unanimous choice for the 1941 College Football All-America Team.  He was awarded the Knute Rockne Memorial Trophy for best collegiate lineman in 1941, and was inducted into the College Football Hall of Fame in 1973.

Peabody served in the United States Navy during World War II, primarily as a Lieutenant aboard the USS Tirante in the Pacific Ocean theater.  He led several boarding parties involving hand-to-hand combat, for which he was awarded several commendations including the Silver Star.

Early forays into politics

While serving in the war, Peabody decided to embark on a career in politics.  After the war ended, he attended Harvard Law School, receiving his J.D. degree and attaining admission to the Massachusetts bar in 1948.  His first political work was on the 1948 presidential campaign of Harry S. Truman.  Truman appointed him an Assistant Regional Counsel for the Office of Price Stabilization in 1950 and Regional Counsel for the Small Defense Plants Administration in 1952.  In 1954 he won election to the Massachusetts Governor's Council, serving one two-year term.
In 1958, Peabody ran for Attorney General of Massachusetts, but lost in the Democratic primary to Edward McCormack, Jr. by nine percentage points.  In 1960, he ran for Governor of Massachusetts, but came in second (out of seven candidates) in the Democratic primary with 25.5% of the vote.  In that year's presidential election, he coordinated John F. Kennedy's campaigns in West Virginia, Pennsylvania, and New Hampshire.

Governorship

In the 1962 gubernatorial election, Peabody was victorious in the race for governor, upsetting the Republican incumbent John A. Volpe by only 4,431 votes out of over two million cast.  Peabody's campaign manager was his law partner Joseph M. Koufman. Peabody was aided in the victory by endorsements from President Kennedy, and the landslide victory of Kennedy's brother Edward in the coinciding race for the president's former United States Senate seat.

During his administration, voters approved a state constitutional amendment extending the terms of office of all state constitutional officers from two years to four years, starting from the next election. Peabody advocated laws to prevent discrimination in housing and to establish drug addiction treatment programs. He also strongly opposed capital punishment and "vowed that he would not sign a death warrant even for the Boston Strangler, if he were ever caught and convicted." This position was controversial, especially because several police officers were killed in the line of duty in the state during his tenure.  Peabody recommended the commutation of every death sentence that he reviewed while governor. Massachusetts' last executions took place in 1947, though the penalty itself remained in force. On June 18, 1964, Peabody signed into law the bill establishing the University of Massachusetts Boston.

On April 1, 1964, the governor's 72-year-old mother, Mary Parkman Peabody, made headlines when she was arrested at the Ponce de Leon Motor Lodge in St. Augustine, Florida, for attempting to be served in an integrated group at a racially segregated restaurant. The action made her a hero to the civil rights movement and brought civil rights efforts in St. Augustine, the nation's oldest city, to national and international attention.

In 1964, Lt. Gov. Francis X. Bellotti mounted a primary campaign against Peabody for the Democratic gubernatorial nomination.  Although Peabody was supported by Senator Kennedy and the party convention, Bellotti was victorious in the primary.  Peabody's loss was variously attributed to his controversial opposition to the death penalty, his stiff demeanor in television appearances, and a bruising defeat he suffered early in his term in opposing the winning candidate for Speaker of the Massachusetts General Court.  Bellotti subsequently lost the general election to John Volpe.

Post-governorship

Senate campaign
In 1966, Peabody ran for the U.S. Senate, for which there was an open seat that year as a result of the retirement of Leverett Saltonstall; he won the Democratic nomination but was defeated by a landslide in the general election by the Republican nominee, the liberal state Attorney General Edward Brooke.

1972 vice presidential election
Peabody undertook a quixotic campaign for Vice President of the United States on the Democratic ticket in 1972; he came in fourth in the balloting at the 1972 Democratic National Convention. He ran under the slogan "Endicott Peabody, the number one man for the number two job."

New Hampshire
In 1983, he moved to Hollis, New Hampshire, where he ran unsuccessfully for local and statewide political office several times, including for the U.S. Senate in 1986 against the Republican incumbent, Warren Rudman.

In 1992, Peabody ran again for vice president by competing in the New Hampshire vice-presidential primary, where he won with 59.7% of the vote. However, the primary is non-binding, and, at the prerogative of the presidential nominee, Bill Clinton of Arkansas, the vice-presidential nomination eventually went to Al Gore of Tennessee. Clinton and Gore subsequently won the general election.

Also in 1992, Peabody ran for a seat in the New Hampshire House of Representatives, but he came in third place with 20.7% of the vote.

Peabody died from leukemia in Hollis in 1997, aged 77. His remains were interred in Groton, Massachusetts.

Family
On June 24, 1944, Peabody married Barbara Welch "Toni" Gibbons (1922–2012), a native of Bermuda, the elder daughter of Morris Gibbons, a member of the Parliament of Bermuda, and his wife, the former Maude Madge Welch. Peabody and his wife had a daughter, Barbara, and two sons, Robert and Endicott Jr.

Peabody's sister, Marietta Peabody Tree, represented the United States on the United Nations Commission on Human Rights.

Navy awards
Silver Star
Presidential Unit Citation for USS Tirante
American Campaign Medal
Asiatic-Pacific Campaign Medal with two battle stars
World War II Victory Medal

Electoral history

1958 Democratic primary for Massachusetts Attorney General
Edward J. McCormack, Jr. – 238,477 (54.63%)
Endicott Peabody – 198,016 (45.36%)

1960 Democratic primary for Governor of Massachusetts
Joseph D. Ward – 180,848 (30.23%)
Endicott Peabody – 152,762 (25.53%)
Francis E. Kelly – 98,107 (16.40%)
Robert F. Murphy – 76,577 (12.80%)
John F. Kennedy – 52,972 (8.85%)
Gabriel Piemonte – 28,199 (4.71%)
Alfred Magaletta – 8,826 (1.48%)

1962 Democratic primary for Governor of Massachusetts
Endicott Peabody – 596,533 (79.96%)
Clement A. Riley – 149,499 (20.04%)

Massachusetts gubernatorial election, 1962
Endicott Peabody (D) – 1,052,322 (49.92%)
John A. Volpe (R) (inc.) – 1,047,891 (49.71%)
Henning A. Bolmen (Socialist Labor) – 5,477 (0.26%)
Guy S. Williams (Prohibition) – 2,394 (0.11%)

1964 Democratic primary for Governor of Massachusetts
Francis X. Bellotti – 363,675 (49.61%)
Endicott Peabody – 336,780 (45.94%)
John J. Droney – 27,357 (3.73%)
Pasquale Caggiano – 5,250 (0.72%)

Democratic primary for Massachusetts United States Senate election, 1966
Endicott Peabody – 320,967 (50.35%)
John F. Collins – 265,016 (41.58%)
Thomas Boylston Adams – 51,435 (8.07%)

Massachusetts United States Senate election, 1966
Edward Brooke (R) – 1,213,473 (60.68%)
Endicott Peabody (D) – 774,761 (38.74%)

1972 Democratic National Convention (Vice Presidential tally)
Thomas Eagleton – 1,742 (59.07%)
Frances Farenthold – 405 (13.73%)
Mike Gravel – 226 (7.66%)
Endicott Peabody – 108 (3.66%)
Clay Smothers – 74 (2.51%)
Birch Bayh – 62 (2.10%)
Peter W. Rodino – 57 (1.93%)
Jimmy Carter – 30 (1.02%)
Shirley Chisholm – 20 (0.68%)
Moon Landrieu – 19 (0.64%)
Edward T. Breathitt – 18 (0.61%)
Ted Kennedy – 15 (0.51%)
Fred R. Harris – 14 (0.48%)
Richard G. Hatcher – 11 (0.37%)
Harold Hughes – 10 (0.34%)
Joseph Montoya – 9 (0.31%)
William L. Guy – 8 (0.27%)
Adlai Stevenson III – 8 (0.27%)
Robert Bergland – 5 (0.17%)
Hodding Carter – 5 (0.17%)
César Chávez – 5 (0.17%)
Wilbur Mills – 5 (0.17%)
Wendell Anderson – 4 (0.14%)
Stanley Arnold – 4 (0.14%)
Ron Dellums – 4 (0.14%)
John J. Houlihan – 4 (0.14%)
Roberto A. Mondragon – 4 (0.14%)
Reubin O'Donovan Askew – 3 (0.10%)
Herman Badillo – 3 (0.10%)
Eugene McCarthy – 3 (0.10%)
Claiborne Pell – 3 (0.10%)
Terry Sanford – 3 (0.10%)
Ramsey Clark – 2 (0.07%)
Richard J. Daley – 2 (0.07%)
John DeCarlo – 2 (0.07%)
Ernest Gruening – 2 (0.07%)
Roger Mudd – 2 (0.07%)
Edmund Muskie – 2 (0.07%)
Claude Pepper – 2 (0.07%)
Abraham A. Ribicoff – 2 (0.07%)
Hoyt Patrick Taylor, Jr. – 2 (0.07%)
Leonard F. Woodcock – 2 (0.07%)
Bruno Agnoli – 2 (0.07%)
Ernest Albright – 1 (0.03%)
William A. Barrett – 1 (0.03%)
Daniel Berrigan – 1 (0.03%)
Philip Berrigan – 1 (0.03%)
Julian Bond – 1 (0.03%)
Skipper Bowles – 1 (0.03%)
Archibald Burton – 1 (0.03%)
Phillip Burton – 1 (0.03%)
William Chappell – 1 (0.03%)
Lawton Chiles – 1 (0.03%)
Frank Church – 1 (0.03%)
Robert Drinan – 1 (0.03%)
Nick Galifianakis – 1 (0.03%)
John Z. Goodrich – 1 (0.03%)
 Michael Griffin – 1 (0.03%)
Martha Griffiths – 1 (0.03%)
 Charles Hamilton – 1 (0.03%)
Patricia Harris – 1 (0.03%)
Jim Hunt – 1 (0.03%)
Daniel Inouye – 1 (0.03%)
Henry M. Jackson – 1 (0.03%)
Robery Kariss – 1 (0.03%)
Allard K. Lowenstein – 1 (0.03%)
Mao Zedong – 1 (0.03%)
Eleanor McGovern – 1 (0.03%)
Martha Beall Mitchell – 1 (0.03%)
Ralph Nader – 1 (0.03%)
George Norcross III – 1 (0.03%)
Jerry Rubin – 1 (0.03%)
Frederic Seaman – 1 (0.03%)
Joe Smith – 1 (0.03%)
Benjamin Spock – 1 (0.03%)
Patrick Tavolacci – 1 (0.03%)
George Wallace – 1 (0.03%)

Democratic primary for U.S. Senate from New Hampshire, 1986
Endicott Peabody – 20,568 (61.18%)
Robert L. Dupay – 6,108 (18.17%)
Robert A. Patton – 3,721 (11.07%)
Andrew D. Tempelman – 2,601 (7.74%)
 Others (write-in candidates) – 619 (1.84%)

New Hampshire United States Senate election, 1986
Warren Rudman (R) (inc.) – 154,090 (62.96%)
Endicott Peabody (D) – 79,222 (32.37%)
Bruce Valley – 11,423 (4.67%)

1992 New Hampshire Democratic vice presidential primary:
Endicott Peabody – 34,533 (59.68%)
Susan K.Y. Shargal – 20,347 (35.16%)
Ralph Nader* – 1,097 (1.90%)
Mario Cuomo* – 739 (1.28%)
Paul Tsongas* – 649 (1.12%)
Bob Kerrey* – 502 (0.87%)

New Hampshire House of Representatives Hillsborough District #22 election, 1992
Susan B. Durham (R) – 2,089 (31.32%)
George W. Wright (R) – 1,925 (28.86%)
Endicott Peabody (D) – 1,378 (20.66%)
Barbara Peabody (D) – 1,279 (19.17%)

(* – write-in candidate)

References

Sources

1920 births
1997 deaths
Endicott (younger)
All-American college football players
American football guards
Democratic Party governors of Massachusetts
Politicians from Lawrence, Massachusetts
Members of the Massachusetts Governor's Council
Groton School alumni
American people of English descent
Players of American football from Massachusetts
Harvard Crimson football players
Harvard Law School alumni
Massachusetts lawyers
New Hampshire Democrats
New Hampshire lawyers
Military personnel from Massachusetts
United States Navy officers
United States Navy personnel of World War II
Recipients of the Silver Star
Deaths from cancer in New Hampshire
Deaths from leukemia
20th-century American lawyers
William Penn Charter School alumni
Sportspeople from Lawrence, Massachusetts
20th-century American politicians
20th-century American Episcopalians
Harvard College alumni